A powder is a collection of very fine particles that may flow freely when shaken or tilted.

Powder may also refer to:

Film and television
 Powder (1995 film), an American science fiction fantasy film
 Powder (2022 film), an Indian Tamil-language thriller film
 Powder (TV series), a TV series on Sony Entertainment Television, India
 A BBC Two ident, used from 1992 until 2001

Music
 Powder (American band), American rock band
 Powder (British band), a mid-1990s Britpop band
 A song from the soundtrack of Cowboy Bebop: Knockin' on Heaven's Door

Other uses
 Powder (hundred), an ancient subdivision of Cornwall in the United Kingdom
 Powder (League of Legends), a video game character
 Powder, Copper, Coal and Otto, the official mascots of the 2002 Winter Olympics in Salt Lake City
 Protocol for Web Description Resources (POWDER), a W3C Working Group
 Powder snow, freshly fallen, uncompacted snow
 Powder River (disambiguation), several places

See also
 Ann Pouder (1807–1917), British American, one of the first modernly recognized supercentenarians in the world
 Baking powder, a leavening agent
 Face powder, cosmetic applied to the face to set a foundation
 Gunpowder, explosive powder used as a propellant
 Metal powder, a powdered metal such as aluminium powder and iron powder
 Powdered cocaine, a crystalline tropane alkaloid that is obtained from the leaves of the coca plant
 Powdered milk, a milk powder made from dried milk solids
 Powder blue, a color
 Washing powder, detergent that is added for cleaning laundry
 
 Powdr, an American company that operates ski resorts in the U.S. and Canada